Jamnadas Majethia (JD) (born 5 February 1969) is an Indian actor, director and producer. He is well known for his work in Gujarati and Hindi plays, dramas, serials & film. Having given successful shows like Sarabhai vs Sarabhai, and Khichdi, he is a very successful showmaker. On stage, he has been active in Gujarati theater for the last 20 years. He formed a company Hats Off Productions. While he is usually associated with comic roles, he is also known to portray supporting characters to a certain extent. 

He was nominated in 2011 for Apsara Award for Best Actor in a Comic Role for his role as Himanshu Seth in Khichdi: The Movie. In 2013, Majethia launched his acting academy, HatsOff Actors Studios.

Personal life
Jamnadas is married to Nipa Majethia. They have two daughters; Kesar and Mishri. Kesar was the narrator in the movie, Khichdi. His second daughter Mishri worked in Khichdi as Chakki Parekh.

Films

Television

Productions

References

External links
 
 

1969 births
Living people
Sindhi people
Gujarati people
Indian male comedians
Indian male television actors
Indian television producers
Indian male stage actors
Participants in Indian reality television series